Wolfgang Bartels (14 July 1940 – 6 February 2007) was a German alpine skier who competed for the United Team of Germany in the 1964 Winter Olympics.

He was born in Bischofswiesen and died in Ramsau bei Berchtesgaden.

In 1964 he won the bronze medal in the Alpine downhill event. In the slalom competition he finished ninth. He also competed in the giant slalom contest but did not finish the race.

References 
 

1940 births
2007 deaths
German male alpine skiers
Olympic alpine skiers of the United Team of Germany
Olympic bronze medalists for the United Team of Germany
Olympic medalists in alpine skiing
Alpine skiers at the 1964 Winter Olympics
Medalists at the 1964 Winter Olympics
20th-century German people